Bigflo (stylized BIGFLO) is a South Korean boy band formed by HO Company. The group consists of three members: Lex, Euijin, and Sungmin, and six former members: Z-UK, Kichun, Ron, HighTop, Jungkyun And Yuseong. They made their debut with the mini-album First Flow on June 23, 2014.

Career

2014: Formation and debut
The band was formed on June 19, 2014, with five members, Jungkyun, HighTop, Ron, Yuseong and Jiwook (Z-UK).

On June 23, 2014, the group debuted with their first EP First Flow, which included the songs "Delilah", "It's You Again", and "Fly". The group's leader at the time Jungkyun and member HighTop contributed lyrics, music and arrangements for all three. HighTop said they worked on it for about three months, and selected songs that best reflected the individuality and merits of the members.

2015–present: Debut in Japan and new members
On April 15, 2015, they debuted in Japan with a single album Delilah (Japanese version), after signing with the same Japanese Company, KISS Entertainment, who other groups BtoB, Girl's Day, and Secret were signed with for their Japanese promotions. They held solo concerts in Japan on April 18 and 26, and album release events in Osaka, Nagoya and Tokyo. While in Japan, they also performed at the KCON Saitama concert on April 22, at the Saitama Super Arena.

On June 18, 2015, they reformed as a six-member group following the additional of new member Kichun, a singer, dancer and actor who studied in China for several years, and is fluent in Chinese, Japanese and Korean. On December 13, 2016, Z-UK and Kichun announced their departure from the group. As a result, the three new members have been added for Bigflo's upcoming mini-album "Stardom" in February 2017.

In October 2017, It was confirmed that Lex and Euijin as well as former member Z-Uk joined The Unit: Idol Rebooting Project. In the finale episode, Euijin was ranked in 2nd place and made it into lineup of winning boy group UNB. 

On January 17, 2019, it was confirmed that Ron, HighTop, Jungkyun and Yuseong officially departed from the group after their contract expired.

Members
Adapted from WAN Entertainment's official website.
 Lex
 Euijin
 Sungmin

Former members
 Z-UK
 Kichun
 Ron
 Jungkyun
 HighTop
 Yuseong

Timeline

Discography

Extended plays

Singles

Notes

References

External links
 

2014 establishments in South Korea
K-pop music groups
South Korean boy bands
South Korean dance music groups
South Korean hip hop groups
South Korean pop music groups
Musical groups established in 2014